Kenneth John O'Brien Jr. (born November 27, 1960) is an American former professional football player who was a quarterback in the National Football League (NFL) for the New York Jets and Philadelphia Eagles. One of the six quarterbacks in the famed quarterback class of 1983, O'Brien was the first quarterback in the franchise history of the Jets to finish with the highest passer rating in a season.  He held the team record for most consecutive pass completions (17) in a game. In 1997, he was inducted into the College Football Hall of Fame.

High school and college career
O'Brien played for Jesuit High School in Carmichael, California.

O'Brien started his collegiate football career in 1978 at Sacramento State as a reserve. He played at the University of California, Davis under coach Jim Sochor. In his senior year, 1982, he was an NCAA Division II All-American.  He led UCD to a 10-0 regular season mark and to the Division II championship game.  He was ranked #2 in total offense and #3 in passing efficiency in Division II. He also won the Babe Slater Award for being the most outstanding male athlete at UC Davis.

O'Brien was selected as All-Far Western Conference QB three times and was selected to the College Football Hall of Fame in 1997.

Professional career
The New York Jets selected O'Brien as the 24th pick in the first round of the 1983 NFL Draft, amazing observers who expected the team to choose fellow quarterback Dan Marino, a future member of the Pro Football Hall of Fame who was selected three picks later. The many Jets fans who attended the draft, held in New York City, were surprised and outraged by the choice; O'Brien was so obscure that New York television reporter Sal Marchiano twice mangled his name while reporting on fan reaction to the draft. (O'Brien said after his retirement, "Who blames [the fans], right? Who, in New York, has heard of Cal, University of California, Davis? Nobody ... I'm not sure I would have reacted any differently. Heck, some of my cousins grew up as Jets fans. They were probably doing the same thing.") Don Shula, who coached the division rival Miami Dolphins (which drafted Dan Marino later in the round) famously asked "Who's he?"

In 1985, O'Brien was the highest rated quarterback in the NFL, finishing the season with a rating of 96.2 while having the lowest interception rate; he was selected to the Pro Bowl that year. The Jets went 11-5 that year to reach the postseason for the first time since 1982. He went 13-of-17 for 149 yards against the New England Patriots with a touchdown and an interception as the Jets lost 26-14. O'Brien later led the NFL with the lowest interception rate in 1987 and 1988.  

On September 21, 1986, O'Brien engaged in a famous duel with Dan Marino when the Jets played the Miami Dolphins. The eventual 51-45 victory saw a combined total of combined for 927 yards and ten passing touchdowns, with O'Brien throwing for 479 with four touchdowns. On November 2 of that same year, he set history against the Seattle Seahawks. He threw for 431 yards while going 26-for-32 to become the first quarterback to achieve a perfect passer rating (158.3) while throwing for 400 yards. This would not be done again until Nick Foles in 2013. O'Brien did a second game with a perfect rating in the December 23, 1990 game against the New England Patriots by going 11-of-12 for 210 yards with two touchdowns. 

O'Brien threw 25 touchdown passes for the second-straight season and helped the Jets post a 10-6 record in 1986. However, Pat Ryan (who won two games as starter) started in the Wild Card Round versus Kansas City, which they won. O'Brien only came in action for the Divisional Round game versus Cleveland when Ryan got hurt early, but the Browns won.

O'Brien went to the Pro Bowl twice, in 1985 and 1991. He retired after spending the 1993 season with the Philadelphia Eagles where he started only four games and mostly served as a backup for Randall Cunningham and Bubby Brister. Despite his occasional flashes with over 25,000 passing yards, O'Brien had a quarterback record of 50-59-1 as a starter, which saw him start over ten games for a team seven times while having a winning record just three times.

Coaching career
After retiring, O'Brien had a stint as an assistant coach for the University of Southern California, where he coached Heisman Trophy winner and former Cincinnati Bengals, Oakland Raiders, and Arizona Cardinals quarterback Carson Palmer.

Personal life
O'Brien and his wife Stacey have four children, with his first grandchild coming in 2018. As of 2019, O'Brien works at IWP Wealth Management in Manhattan Beach, California.

See also
 List of NFL quarterbacks who have posted a perfect passer rating

References

External links

1960 births
Living people
American football quarterbacks
New York Jets players
Philadelphia Eagles players
UC Davis Aggies football players
UC Davis Aggies football coaches
USC Trojans football coaches
American Conference Pro Bowl players
College Football Hall of Fame inductees
Ed Block Courage Award recipients
People from Carmichael, California
People from Rockville Centre, New York
Sportspeople from Sacramento County, California
Players of American football from California
Sacramento State Hornets football players